Sir David Gill   (12 June 1843 – 24 January 1914) was a Scottish astronomer who is known for measuring astronomical distances, for astrophotography, and for geodesy.  He spent much of his career in South Africa.

Life and work 

David Gill was born at 48 Skene Terrace in Aberdeen the son of David Gill, watchmaker and his wife Margaret Mitchell. He was educated first at Bellevue Academy in Aberdeen then at Dollar Academy.  He spent two years at Aberdeen University, where he was taught by James Clerk Maxwell, and then joined his father's clock-making business. His most important influence at university was probably from Prof David Thomson. In 1863 they jointly repaired the university clock and both set up a new mechanical telescope at the Cromwell Tower Observatory. This was his introduction to astronomy.

It would seem that Gill's interests lay elsewhere since after a few years he sold the business, and then spent time equipping Lord Lindsay's private observatory at Dun Echt, Aberdeenshire. In 1874, Gill joined the expedition to Mauritius to observe the transit of Venus. Three years later he went to Ascension Island to observe a near approach of Mars and to calculate its distance. While carrying out these laborious calculations, he was notified of his appointment to the Cape Observatory, which, over the following 27 years he was to refurbish completely, turning it into a first-rate institution. Gill was a meticulous observer and had a flair for getting the best out of his instruments. His solar parallax observations with a heliometer and his calculations of distances to the nearer stars, are testimony to his outstanding work. He recruited Robert Innes to the Cape Observatory.

Gill used the parallax of Mars to determine the distance to the Sun, and also measured distances to the stars.  He perfected the use of the heliometer.  He was Her Majesty's Astronomer at the Royal Observatory at Cape of Good Hope from 1879 to 1906. He was a pioneer in the use of astrophotography, making the first photograph of the Great Comet of 1882, and one of the early proponents of the Carte du Ciel project.

The invention of dry plate photography by Richard Leach Maddox made Gill realise that the process could be used to create images of the stars and to more easily determine their relative positions and brightness. This led to a massive project in collaboration with the Dutch astronomer J.C. Kapteyn, and the compiling of an index of brightness and position for some half a million southern stars. The work was published as Cape Photographic Durchmusterung in 3 volumes between 1896 and 1900. Gill also played a leading role in the organising of the Carte du Ciel, an ambitious international venture aimed at mapping the entire sky. He initiated the idea of a geodetic survey along the 30th meridian east stretching from South Africa to Norway, resulting in the longest meridian yet measured on Earth.

His concern with measurement led to him becoming a member of the International Committee for Weights and Measures (CIPM) from 1907 - 1914.  As president of the British Association for the Advancement of Science, he gave a presidential address in 1907 in which he advocated definitions based on fundamental physical properties, rather than on arbitrary standards such as a  rod of metal with lines ruled upon it to mark the yard or metre. 

Gill married Isobel Black in 1870, and she accompanied him to Ascension Island for his Mars observations.  On Gill's retirement in 1906, the couple moved to London, where Gill served for two years (1909–1911) as president of the Royal Astronomical Society before his death in 1914.  

He was buried with his wife, Isobel Sarah Gill, in the grounds of St Machar's Cathedral, Aberdeen. The grave lies on the east outer wall of the church.

Selected writings 
His writings include:

"A Determination of the Solar Parallax from Observations of Mars at the Island of Ascension" (in the Memoirs of the Royal Astronomical Society, volumes xlvi and xlviii, 1881 and 1885). New International Encyclopedia

Honours
 Elected Fellow of the Royal Society, 7 June 1883
 Companion of the Order of the Bath, 20 May 1896
 Knight Commander of the Order of the Bath, 24 May 1900
 President, Royal Astronomical Society, 1909–1911
 Member of the Royal Swedish Academy of Sciences, 1910

Lectures
In 1909 he was invited to deliver the Royal Institution Christmas Lecture on Astronomy, Old and New.

Awards
Valz Prize (1879)
Bruce Medal (1900)
Gold Medal of the Royal Astronomical Society (1882 and 1908)
James Craig Watson Medal (1899)

Named after him
Gill (lunar crater)
Gill (Martian crater)

References

External links

Bruce Medal page
Awarding of Bruce Medal: PASP 12 (1900) 49
Awarding of RAS gold medal, 1882: MNRAS 42 (1882) 216
Awarding of RAS gold medal, 1908: MNRAS 68 (1908) 317
Biographical sources

Obituaries
MNRAS 75 (1915) 236
PASP 26 (1914) 67

1843 births
1914 deaths
Scottish astronomers
19th-century British astronomers
South African astronomers
Alumni of the University of Aberdeen
Fellows of the Royal Society
Royal Medal winners
Members of the Royal Swedish Academy of Sciences
Corresponding members of the Saint Petersburg Academy of Sciences
Recipients of the Gold Medal of the Royal Astronomical Society
Foreign Fellows of the Royal Astronomical Society
Fellows of the Royal Astronomical Society
Foreign associates of the National Academy of Sciences
Recipients of the Bruce Medal
Presidents of the British Science Association
People educated at Dollar Academy
Presidents of the Royal Astronomical Society
Knights Commander of the Order of the Bath
Recipients of the Pour le Mérite (civil class)
20th-century British astronomers
Presidents of the Southern Africa Association for the Advancement of Science